Brian Clark (born December 26, 1983) is a former American football wide receiver. He was signed by the Denver Broncos as an undrafted free agent in 2006. He played college football at North Carolina State.

Clark has also been a member of the Tampa Bay Buccaneers and Detroit Lions.

Professional career

Denver Broncos
Clark played for the Denver Broncos from 2006 to 2007.

Tampa Bay Buccaneers
Clark played for the Tampa Bay Buccaneers from 2007 to 2009.

Detroit Lions
Clark signed with the Detroit Lions on March 8, 2010. He was released on September 4.

Florida Tuskers
Clark was signed by the Florida Tuskers of the United Football League on November 16, 2010.

References

1983 births
Living people
George D. Chamberlain High School alumni
Players of American football from Jacksonville, Florida
American football wide receivers
American football return specialists
NC State Wolfpack football players
Denver Broncos players
Tampa Bay Buccaneers players
Detroit Lions players
Florida Tuskers players